Echis borkini is a species of viper. Like all vipers, it is venomous. It was originally described as subspecies of Echis varius.

Geographic range
The snake is found in southwestern Saudi Arabia and western Yemen.

References 

Viperinae
Snakes of Asia
Reptiles of the Arabian Peninsula
Reptiles described in 1990